Yiu Yau is one of the 39 constituencies in the Yuen Long District of Hong Kong.

The constituency returns one district councillor to the Yuen Long District Council, with an election every four years.

Yiu Yau constituency is loosely based on Tin Yiu (II) Estate and part of Tin Yau Court with estimated population of 13,916.

Councillors represented

Election results

2010s

References

Tin Shui Wai
Constituencies of Hong Kong
Constituencies of Yuen Long District Council
2015 establishments in Hong Kong
Constituencies established in 2015